is a Japanese footballer currently playing as a forward for Machida Zelvia.

Career statistics

Club
.

Notes

References

1999 births
Living people
Association football people from Osaka Prefecture
Japanese footballers
Association football forwards
J2 League players
Renofa Yamaguchi FC players
FC Machida Zelvia players